Peace Regis Mutuuzo is a Ugandan politician who serves as the Women representative for Bunyangabu District. She is the Minister of State for Gender and Culture in the Ugandan Cabinet. She was appointed to that position on 6 June 2016. In 2021, she was re elected into the eleventh Uganda Parliament.

Background and education
She was born in on 2 May 1975, in Rwimi sub-county, Bunyangabu county, in Kabarole District, in the Western Region of Uganda. Since then, Bunyangabu county was transformed into Bunyangabu District.  She studied at St. Peter and Paul Primary School, Katikamu SDA Secondary School and at Mpanga Secondary School in Fort Portal. She was the head-girl while at Mpanga.

She attended National Teachers College Kakoba (NTCK), now a component of Bishop Stuart University in Mbarara, graduating with a Diploma in Secondary Education. She served as the president of the students' guild at NTCK, while there.

She then joined Makerere University, the oldest public university in Uganda, graduating with a Bachelor of Environmental Science. Later, she obtained a Master of Public Administration and Management from Uganda Management Institute in Kampala.

Career
Prior to joining active politics, she worked with Give and Take company owned by John Sanyu Katuramu (serving life sentence in Luzira Prison) and later in the Office of the President, as the Private Secretary to the President of Uganda. In 2016, she contested for the position of Woman Representative for Kabarole District, but was defeated in the primary elections of the National Resistance Movement political party. On 6 June 2016, she was appointed State Minister for Gender and Culture.

One of the first tasks she embarked on in her new ministerial post is the problem sexual violence. Another item on her agenda is the planned re-development, expansion and renovation of the National Theater, which was built in 1959 and is now too small to accommodate large audiences. She is a member of the National Resistance Movement political party.

See also
 Cabinet of Uganda
 Parliament of Uganda

References

External links
 Website of Parliament of Uganda

Living people
Government ministers of Uganda
Members of the Parliament of Uganda
National Resistance Movement politicians
People from Bunyangabu District
People from Western Region, Uganda
Uganda Management Institute alumni
Makerere University alumni
Bishop Stuart University alumni
1975 births
Women government ministers of Uganda
Women members of the Parliament of Uganda
21st-century Ugandan politicians
21st-century Ugandan women politicians